B31 or B-31 may refer to:
 B-31 (Michigan county highway)
 B31 (New York City bus)
 Bundesstraße 31, a German road
 Douglas XB-31, an experimental aircraft